Lucie Brock-Broido (May 22, 1956 – March 6, 2018) was an American author of four collections of poetry.

Biography
She was born in Pittsburgh, Pennsylvania.

A graduate of the Johns Hopkins Writing Seminars, she was Director of Poetry in the Writing Division at Columbia University School of the Arts in New York City.

Her long narrative poem, Jessica from the Well, tells the story of 18-month-old Jessica McClure, who was trapped in a well in Texas, from McClure's point of view, describing her as having a basic understanding of the physical and mythic elements of her situation. It has been reprinted numerous times.

Brock-Broido died on March 6, 2018, aged 61, from cancer at her home in Cambridge, Massachusetts.

Awards and honors
 She received many honors, including the Witter-Bynner prize of Poetry from the American Academy of Arts and Letters, the Harvard Phi Beta Kappa Teaching Award, the Harvard-Danforth Award for Distinction in Teaching, the Jerome J. Shestack Poetry Prize from American Poetry Review, two National Endowment for the Arts fellowships, and a Guggenheim fellowship. 
2013 National Book Critics Circle Award (Poetry) shortlist for Stay, Illusion

Bibliography

Collections

 
Trouble in Mind  (Alfred A. Knopf, 2004)
Stay, Illusion (Alfred A. Knopf, 2013)

List of poems

Critical studies and reviews of Brock-Broido's work

References

External links
The Borzoi Reader, randomhouse.com; accessed March 8, 2018.
"Little Industry of Ghosts", gulfcoastmag.org; accessed March 8, 2018.
Lucie Brock-Broido Papers at the Columbia University Rare Book & Manuscript Library

1956 births
2018 deaths
Writers from Pittsburgh
American women poets
Columbia University faculty
Harvard University people
The New Yorker people
Deaths from cancer in Massachusetts
20th-century American poets
20th-century American women writers
21st-century American poets
21st-century American women writers
American women academics